Stuart Robert Henderson is a Canadian historian, culture critic, filmmaker, and musician. He is a writer and producer with 90th Parallel Productions, a documentary film company. He is the author of the Clio award-winning book Making the Scene, Yorkville and Hip Toronto in the 1960s (University of Toronto Press, 2011). "Making the Scene" focuses on the history of 1960s Yorkville as a mecca for Toronto's and Canada's counterculture.

Since joining 90th Parallel Productions in 2014 he has produced several award-winning documentaries including The Skin We're In, Invisible Essence: The Little Prince, and My First 150 Days. Working with Jesse Wente and Justine Pimlott, he produced Inconvenient Indian, a feature documentary from director Michelle Latimer. The film, based on the best-selling book by Thomas King, will premiere at the Toronto International Film Festival in 2020.

Henderson has held post-doctoral fellowships at McMaster University (2008-2009) and York University (2009-2011) where he conducted research on Toronto's Rochdale College and what he has termed "hip separatism" in the 1970s.  He has taught Canadian cultural history courses at the University of Toronto and Queen's University. His doctoral dissertation was honoured by the Canadian Historical Association with the John Bullen Prize for best PhD thesis (2008).

Henderson's academic work has appeared in the Journal of Canadian Studies, the Canadian Historical Review, LeftHistory, the Journal of Canadian Historical Association and the Journal for the Study of Radicalism.

He has worked as the editor of the Americana section at Exclaim! and as a features editor at PopMatters Media Inc, where he was also a frequent contributor. He has conducted interviews with a wide range of artists, including Keira Knightley, Mickey Hart of the Grateful Dead, Richard Thompson, Sarah Harmer, Steve Earle, and Viggo Mortensen.

Henderson is on the jury for the Polaris Music Prize and has worked as the national pop culture columnist for CBC Radio One. On May 15, 2011 Henderson was elected to the executive board of the Popular Culture Association of Canada. He lives in Toronto.

References

External links 
 GhostWalk Creek on MySpace 
 PopMatters archive contributor
 Robert Fulford "On the hippies of Yorkville Yore", The National Post 

21st-century Canadian historians
Canadian male non-fiction writers
Living people
Canadian documentary film producers
21st-century Canadian non-fiction writers
Year of birth missing (living people)
Fellows of the American Physical Society